The following lists events that happened during 1943 in Chile.

Incumbents
President of Chile: Juan Antonio Ríos

Events

January
20 January - After pressure from the United States in the context of World War II, the President of the Republic, Juan Antonio Rios, in agreement with the Senate, decided to break relations with the Axis countries, Germany, Italy and Japan.

April
6 April - At 12:07 p.m. there is a Earthquake 8.2 degrees in the Richter magnitude scale whose epicenter was located in the city of Ovalle, Coquimbo Region. It had a balance of 12 dead, 49 wounded and 23,250 victims.

July
9 July - The Organic Code of Courts enters into force, a legal body that regulates the organization and powers of the courts of justice as well as the statute and functions of those in charge of the administration of justice.

October
15 October - The first edition of the newspaper Las Noticias de Última Hora circulates.

December
1 December – Endesa (Chile) is created as a subsidiary of CORFO.
30 December - The latest edition of the newspaper El Progreso de Coquimbo circulates.

Births 
16 March – Manuel Astorga
19 March – Francisco Valdés (d. 2009)
26 March – Guillermo Yávar
7 May – Orlando Ramírez (footballer) (d. 2018)
2 June – José Miguel Insulza
13 September – Adolfo Zaldívar (d. 2013)
23 September – Ignacio Prieto
3 October – Adriana Valdés

Deaths
26 July – Luis Barros Borgoño (b. 1858)

References 

 
Years of the 20th century in Chile
Chile